Tanika Gupta  (born 1 December 1963) is a British playwright. Apart from her work for the theatre, she has also written scripts for television, film and radio plays.

Early life
Tanika Gupta was born in London to immigrant parents from Kolkata, India where her family had their origins. As a child, Gupta performed Tagore dance dramas with her parents.

Her mother Gairika Gupta was an Indian classically trained dancer, and her father Tapan Gupta was a singer. The Indian revolutionary Dinesh Gupta was her great uncle.

After attending Copthall Comprehensive School in London and then Mill Hill School for her A levels, Gupta graduated from Oxford University with a Modern History degree.

After Oxford, her political commitment found expression in her work for an Asian women's refuge in Manchester. In 1988, she married David Archer an anti-poverty activist and ActionAid's current Head of Tax Justice and Public Services, whom she met at university. She and her husband then moved to London where Gupta was initially a community worker in Islington, writing in her spare time.

Career
Over the past 25 years Tanika has written over 25 stage plays that have been produced in major theatres across the UK. She has also written 30 radio plays for the BBC and several original television dramas, as well as scripts for EastEnders, Grange Hill and The Bill.

The Waiting Room (produced for the National Theatre in 2000) was an early career highpoint with Indian film star Shabana Azmi performing on the stage in London for the first time.

Gupta's 2013 play The Empress, about Abdul Karim and Queen Victoria opened in Stratford upon Avon and is now on the GCSE curriculum along with her adaptation of Ibsen's A Doll's House which was first performed at Hammersmith Lyric in 2018. Writing in The Daily Telegraph, Dominic Cavendish praised The Empress “This fascinating new theatre production has got ‘make this into a movie’ written all over it.”

Her play Lions and Tigers performed at the Sam Wannamaker in Shakespeare's Globe Theatre tells the remarkable story set in the 1930s of her great uncle, Dinesh Gupta, an Indian freedom fighter. Lions and Tigers is now published in Methuen's series of Modern Classics. Praise for Lions and Tigers singled out the " intimate storytelling, where Gupta's writing is at its most playful and potent" for particular note.

Other notable plays include Sugar Mummies (Royal Court Theatre 2006); Gladiator Games (Sheffield Crucible Theatre 2006); Hobson's Choice (Young Vic 2001 and Manchester Royal Exchange 2018). Her most recent productions are Mirror on the Moor (Royal Court Living Newspaper, April 2021) and The Overseas Student (Hammersmith Lyric, June 2021).

Personal life
Gupta and her husband have two daughters, Nandini (born 1991), Niharika (born 1993) and a son Malini (born 2000).

Works

Theatre plays

Radio plays

Filmography

Awards and recognition
In 2008, Gupta was appointed a Member of the Order of the British Empire (MBE) in the 2008 New Year Honours for her services to drama. In June 2016 she was made a Fellow of the Royal Society of Literature. In 2018, Gupta was awarded with the James Tait Black Memorial Prize for Drama for her play Lions and Tigers.

 EMMA (BT Ethnic and Multicultural Media Award for Best Television Production) (screenplay), for Flight (1998)
 John Whiting Award, for The Waiting Room (2000)
 Asian Women of Achievement Award (Arts and Culture category) (2003)
 EMMA (BT Ethnic and Multicultural Media Award for Best Play) (adaptation), for Hobson's Choice (2004)
 Laurence Olivier Award for Outstanding Achievement in an Affiliate Theatre, for Fragile Land/Hobson's Choice (2004)
 Amnesty International UK Media Awards (radio play) Chitra (2005)
 Member of the Order of the British Empire in the Birthday Honours (2008)
 BBC Audio Drama Award for Best Adaptation, for A Doll's House (2013) 
 Fellow of the Royal Society of Literature (2016)
Asian Achievers Awards - Achievement in Media (2017) 
 James Tait Black Memorial Prize for Drama for Lions and Tigers (2018)

See also
 British Indians
 List of British Indians

References

External links
 
 
 Tanika Gupta – In Yer Face Theatre
 "Tanika Gupta", British Council Literature
 2 Young 2 Luv
 Great Expectations adapted by Tanika Gupta, premieres at Watford Palace Theatre
 "20 Questions With… Tanika Gupta". Whatsonstage 21 January 2008
 Barnett, Laura. "Portrait of the artist: Tanika Gupta, playwright". The Guardian. 14 February 2011
 Tanika Gupta. The Asian Writer. 22 June 2011

1963 births
Living people
English Hindus
English people of Bengali descent
English people of Indian descent
English screenwriters
English women dramatists and playwrights
British Asian writers
20th-century English dramatists and playwrights
20th-century English women writers
21st-century English writers
21st-century English women writers
People from Chiswick
People educated at Mill Hill School
Alumni of the University of Oxford
Members of the Order of the British Empire
Fellows of the Royal Society of Literature